The Group of 88 is the term for the professors at Duke University who were signatories to a controversial advertisement in The Chronicle, the university's student newspaper, on April 6, 2006. The advertisement addressed the Duke lacrosse case, in which an African-American woman claimed to have been raped by three white members of Duke's lacrosse team several weeks earlier. The incident was under police investigation at the time of the advertisement, and all charges were dropped and the students declared innocent by the North Carolina Attorney General a year after its publication. The signatories stated they were attempting to start a dialogue regarding issues of race and sexual assault, but they and the advertisement attracted widespread criticism.

Background

Duke lacrosse case

Crystal Mangum, an African-American student at North Carolina Central University who worked as a stripper, was hired to perform at a party held at the house of two of the team's captains in Durham, North Carolina, on March 13, 2006. Several hours after the party, after becoming involved in an altercation with her fellow stripper that necessitated police assistance, Mangum made accusations that three white Duke University lacrosse team members had raped her, which were later shown to be false.

Inspiration for the Chronicle advertisement
At a March 29 African & African-American Studies forum, students "were invited to voice their frustration with the current situation and, it became apparent, with the university as a whole". The students' remarks formed the basis for the advertisement. The ad described the circumstances surrounding the allegations as a "social disaster" and cited anonymous claims of sexism and harassment at the Duke campus. The ad specifically called for students to be vocal on the issues.

Commentary and criticism

National media
John Podhoretz wrote in the New York Post that: "The school has perhaps 700 professors who teach undergrads. So, at a moment when Duke students were being shadowed by a rape accusation, one-ninth of their professoriate had effectively declared that those students did not deserve the presumption of innocence – primarily because so many of their fellow students were supposedly being victimized by the atmosphere of 'racism and sexism. Podhoretz quoted Stephen Baldwin, a professor of chemistry: "There was a collision between political correctness and due process, and political correctness won."

In Howard Wasserman's Institutional Failures, he cites an investigation into the lacrosse players' personal behavior by Duke Law School professor James Earl Coleman, who found  the players were "good students who caused no problems in the class, treated Duke staffers with respect...and had no record of sexist, racist, or other forms of anti-social behavior."

Duke students and faculty
One signer, Kim Curtis, a visiting associate professor in the Political Science department who specializes in political and feminist theory, failed two members of the lacrosse team who were in one of her classes. When one of them appealed the grade, Duke did not act immediately; they eventually raised his grade from "F" to "D". Kyle Dowd and his parents sued Curtis and the university. Duke later settled, listing the grade as "Pass".

An engineering professor at Duke, Michael Gustafson, was concerned that the restrictions on stereotyping had been done away with. He suggested that the accused lacrosse players had not been evaluated as individuals, but as caricatures, making it easier for commentators to criticize them.

One of the signers, English professor Cathy Davidson, wrote in the Raleigh News & Observer in January 2007 that the ad was a response "to the anguish of students who felt demeaned by racist and sexist remarks swirling around in the media and on the campus quad in the aftermath of what happened on March 13 in the lacrosse house."

Ten months after the original letter to The Chronicle, a group of 17 economics faculty signed an alternative petition, stating "the Group of 88 does not speak for all Duke faculty".

Clarifying letter
On January 16, 2007, a letter was posted at the newly established Concerned Duke Faculty website. It was signed by 87 faculty members, many of whom had been among the "Group of 88". They stated the ad had been misinterpreted and that the intent of the original ad had been to address issues of racism and sexism in the community, not to prejudge the case: "We reject all attempts to try the case outside the courts, and stand firmly by the principle of the presumption of innocence", and refused "to retract the ad or apologize for it." The letter said that Duke fosters an "atmosphere that allows sexism, racism, and sexual violence to be so prevalent on campus."

Aftermath
A 2007 poll of Duke faculty showed that 82 percent were "troubled by the actions by the Group of 88."

References

External links
List of Duke Faculty signatories
Concerned Duke Faculty website

2006 in lacrosse
2006 in North Carolina
2007 in North Carolina
Academic scandals
Duke Blue Devils men's lacrosse
History of Durham, North Carolina
Mass media-related controversies in the United States
Race and law in the United States